Synixais is a genus of longhorn beetles of the subfamily Lamiinae, containing the following species:

 Synixais banksi Breuning, 1938
 Synixais fuscomaculata Aurivillius, 1911
 Synixais notaticollis Breuning, 1964
 Synixais strandi Breuning, 1940
 Synixais sumatrensis Breuning, 1982

References

Pteropliini